Melanoplus franciscanus, the San Francisco short-wing grasshopper, is a species of spur-throated grasshopper in the family Acrididae. It is found in the American Southwest, in the Guadalupe Mountains of Texas and from the San Mateo Mountains of New Mexico to the San Francisco Peaks of Arizona.
.

References

Endemic fauna of Arizona
Endemic fauna of New Mexico
Endemic fauna of Texas
Insects described in 1898
Melanoplinae
Articles created by Qbugbot